Ananda Chandra Barua (1907–1983) was a writer, poet, playwright, translator, journalist and actor from Assam. He is popularly known as Bokulbonor Kobi (বকুলবনৰ কবি) in Assamese literacy society. He was honoured with, most notably the Padma Shri title and Sahitya Akademi award.

Literacy works
Published books
Porag (1930) (Poem collection)
Bijoya (1932) (drama)
Hafizor Sur (1933) (translation of poems)
Bisorjan (1933) (drama)
Ranjan Rashmi (1934), (Poem collection)
Puspak (1934) (sonnets)
Nal Damayanty (1934) (drama)
Meghdoot Purbamegh (1940) (translated poems)
Komota Kuwori (1940) (drama)
Asiar Jyoti (1960)
Translation work;
Soviet Kabita (1968)(translated poems)
Kumar Sambhav (1969)(translated poems)
Paporir Porimal (1969) (Poem collection)
Bokul Bonor Kabita (1976)(Poem collection)
Sei Nimati Puware Pora (1982) (Poem collection)
Kopoi Kuwari (Children drama)
Nilanjan (drama)
Pondit Modon Mohan Malaviyar Jiboni (biography of Pandit Madan Mohan Malaviya)
Ethan From (translations)
Unpublished but completed works
Panchami (children drama)
Tejimola (children drama)
Phulora (children’s one-act-play)
Sahjahanor Ontim (translated play)
Bonik Bondhu (translated play)
Sitaharan (drama)
Mrigamaya (drama) and
Banipath (for school curriculum)
Agnigarh (drama)
Asomiya Deka (novel) and
Amar Sahitya (for public education)

Awards and honours
Barua received the fourth-highest civilian award ‘Padma Shri' (1970) from the Government of India on 21 April 1970.

For his poetry book Bokul Bonor Kabita (1976), he achieved the Sahitya Academy Award in 1977.

Bakulbon Park (বকুলবন উদ্যান) is named after Ananda Chandra Barua in Jorhat as a tribute to him.

The Bakul Bon Award is conferred every year in the fields of dancing, music, art and literature in the memory of 'Bakul Bonor Kabi' Ananda Chandra Barua by the Bakul Bon Trust, Assam which carries a sum of Rs 10,000 in cash and a citation.

See also
Assamese literature
History of Assamese literature
List of Asam Sahitya Sabha presidents
List of Sahitya Akademi Award winners for Assamese
List of Assamese-language poets
List of Assamese writers with their pen names

References

External links
Hafiz and I, a translated poem by Ananda Chandra Barua at poemhunter.com.
N. Sharma (1976). Assamese Literature. Otto Harrassowitz Verlag. pp. 91–. . Retrieved 21 May 2013.
An image of Ananda Chandra Barua  with Bhupen Hazarika at onlinesivasagar.com.

Poets from Assam
Assamese-language poets
Asom Sahitya Sabha Presidents
1907 births
1983 deaths
People from Jorhat district
Recipients of the Sahitya Akademi Award in Assamese
Recipients of the Padma Shri in literature & education
Assamese actors
Dramatists and playwrights from Assam
Journalists from Assam
Banaras Hindu University alumni
20th-century Indian poets